Sukuma is a Bantu language of Tanzania, spoken in an area southeast of Lake Victoria between Mwanza, Shinyanga, and Lake Eyasi.

Its orthography uses Roman script without special letters, which resembles that used for Swahili, and has been used for Bible translations and in religious literature.

Dialects (KɪmunaSukuma in the west, GɪmunaNtuzu/GɪnaNtuzu in the northeast, and Jìnàkɪ̀ɪ̀yâ/JimunaKɪɪyâ in the southeast) are easily mutually intelligible.

Phonology

There are seven vowel qualities, which occur long and short:

Sukuma has gone through Dahl's Law (ɪdàtʊ́ 'three', from proto-Bantu -tatʊ) and has voiceless nasal consonants.

Syllables are V or CV. There are four tones on short vowels: high, low, rising, and falling.

Grammar
The following description is based on the JinaKɪɪya dialect. One of the characteristics of that dialect is that the noun-class prefixes subject to Dahl's Law  have been levelled to voiced consonants and so they no longer alternate.

Noun concord
Sukuma noun-class prefixes are augmented by pre-prefixes a-, ɪ-, ʊ-, which are dropped in certain constructions. The noun classes and the agreement that they trigger are as follows,   with attested forms in other dialects being added in parentheses:

(For compatibility,  is transcribed .)

Many kin terms have a reduced form of the nominal prefixes, zero and βa-, called class 1a/2a, as in  'mother',  'mothers'. Concord is identical with other class-1/2 nouns.

Singular/plural pairs are 1/2, 5/6, 7/8, 9/10, and 12/13, and locative classes 16, 17, and 18 do not have plurals. Most others use class 6 for their plurals: 11/6, 14/6, 15/6, and also sometimes 7/6 and 12/6. There are also nouns that inflect as 11/4, 11/14, 14/10, and 15/8.

Verbal complex
Infinitive verbs have the form gʊ-object-ext-ROOT-ext-V-locative, where ext stands for any of various grammatical 'extensions', and -V is the final vowel. For example, with roots in bold and tone omitted,

gũ-n-tĩn-ĩl-a
'To cut for him/her'
gwĩ-tĩn-ĩl-a
'To cut for each other'
-ĩl is the applicative suffix, translated as 'for'. The reciprocal prefix ĩ has fused into the infinitive gũ.
gũ-fum-a-mo
'To get out there'
-mo is a locative 'inside', as in class 18 nominal concord.

Finite verbs have the form subject-TAM-ext-object-ROOT-ext-TAM-V. For example,
βa-lĩ-n-iiš-a
'They are feeding him/her'
The root iiš includes a fused causative suffix. Tense is marked by a prefix. The subject marker βa- shows that the subject is human plural, per the noun-concord table above.

o-dũ-saang-ile
'He found us'
Here tense is marked by a suffix.

βa-gĩ-gunaan-a
'They helped each other/themselves'
Here the prefix is fused tense and reciprocal ĩ.

Language identity

It is reported that although Sukuma is very similar to Nyamwezi, speakers themselves do not accept that they make up a single language.

References

 
Northeast Bantu languages
Languages of Tanzania